Cheryl Lynn (born Lynda Cheryl Smith; March 11, 1957) is an American singer. She is best known for her songs during the late 1970s through the mid-1980s, including the 1978 R&B/disco song "Got to Be Real".

Early life and working on stage
Lynn's singing career began with her church choir when she was a young girl. Her professional singing career began in 1976 (aged 19) when she obtained a job as a backing vocalist for the national touring company of the musical drama The Wiz. Eventually, she obtained the role of Evillene, the Wicked Witch of the West, during the six-month national tour. Before her appearance in The Wiz, Lynn appeared in an episode of The Gong Show, a daytime entertainment TV show during June 1976, performing Joe Cocker's "You Are So Beautiful".

Career

1976–85: the Columbia Records years
After her performance on The Gong Show, Ahmed Ertegun of Atlantic Records was unable to attend an initial meeting with Lynn, with the result that she was contracted with Columbia Records. She released her first and best-known song, "Got to Be Real," which was composed by Lynn alongside keyboardist David Paich (of the band Toto) and David Foster. The song peaked at No. 12 on the Billboard Hot 100 record chart and No. 1 on the Rhythm & Blues chart. The success of the single prompted her debut album, Cheryl Lynn, which was produced by Paich and Marty Paich. It sold more than a million copies and scored No. 5 on Billboard magazines R&B albums chart and No. 23 on the Billboard 200. The next single from the album, written by Judy Wieder and John Footman, "Star Love", also became a top-selling success.

Wieder and Footman joined songwriting forces with the artist for her second album, In Love. The first single, "I've Got Just What You Need", was a moderate hit on the R&B chart. The follow-up single, "Keep It Hot", was a club hit. During this time, members of the rock music group Toto were producing their debut album. During the production Lynn was asked to provide the female backing vocal for one of the album's singles, "Georgy Porgy". The single scored No. 48 on Billboard'''s popular music chart. Although Toto would go on to chart more than a dozen pop and rock songs throughout the years, Lynn's vocal was credited for the group's charting their only R&B (No. 18) and dance (No. 80) hit on the Billboard chart.

In 1981, Ray Parker Jr. was called in to produced Lynn's third album, In the Night. It featured the major dance and R&B single, "Shake It Up, Tonight". The next year, Luther Vandross was asked to produce Lynn's fourth album, Instant Love. The second single from the album, "If This World Were Mine", a 1982 duet with Vandross that was a cover version of a previous Marvin Gaye and Tammi Terrell song. For her fifth album, Preppie, Lynn produced most of the tracks, with the exception of the single "Encore", which was written and produced by the Minneapolis funk music duo, Jimmy Jam and Terry Lewis. It became Lynn's second No. 1 single on the R&B charts.

Soundtracks
Lynn also recorded soundtracks for a few feature films, including a song written by Michael Bolton entitled "At Last You're Mine" for the 1985 film Heavenly Bodies, and the track "Steppin' Into the Night" for the 1986 feature film Armed and Dangerous. The song and the film's soundtrack were produced by Maurice White.

1987–98: Whatever It Takes, Good Time and The Real Thing 
In 1989, Lynn released the top 10 single "Every Time I Try to Say Goodbye", from her eighth album, Whatever It Takes.

She began the 1990s without a record contract. She did mostly session work for Richard Marx albums, Rush Street and Paid Vacation as well as Luther Vandross' Your Secret Love album. During 1995, after a six-year hiatus from recording her own material, Lynn teamed with producer/songwriter Teddy Riley (formerly of the new jack swing music group Guy), to record her ninth album, Good Time. It was released in Japan and the UK, and later in the United States as an imported CD. It featured on the nightclub-fave single album "Guarantee for My Heart".

In 1996, Sony Records/Legacy released Got to Be Real – The Best of Cheryl Lynn, which included Lynn's most successful recordings from her years with Columbia Records. This was followed soon by another compilation CD, The Real Thing, which featured other recordings from Lynn's first six albums.

Two years later, she performed on HBO's Sinbad's Summer Soul Jam 4 (1998), hosted by comedian Sinbad.

Later career
During the new millennium, Lynn toured Japan and did an occasional gig in the United States, performing at charity events in her hometown of Los Angeles. In 2000, she worked with hip-hop musician Jay Supreme on his single "Your Love (Encore)", which was an updated version of "Encore." She performed on ABC's The Disco Ball... A 30-Year Celebration, broadcast during January 2003. In 2004, she recorded the song "Sweet Kind of Life," which was also written and produced by Jam & Lewis, for the soundtrack to Shark Tale. In 2005, Lynn's song "Got to Be Real" was inducted into the Dance Music Hall of Fame. On May 23, 2006, Collectables' record label re-released her 1981 album In the Night and 1982's Instant Love, in a double CD package form. It was the first time ever that either album was released as a CD in the United States.

Lynn is considered an influence on some of today's R&B female singers, including Mary J. Blige, who, alongside Will Smith, covered Lynn's song ("Got to Be Real"). Japanese pop singer Kumi Koda covered the song for her 2010 single album Gossip Candy.

In April 2010, "Got to Be Real" charted for the first time in the UK, peaking at number 70.

Discography
Studio albums

Compilation albumsGot to Be Real: The Best of Cheryl Lynn'' (1996, Legacy/Columbia)

Singles

As featured performer

See also
List of 1970s one-hit wonders in the United States

References

External links
 Cheryl Lynn at Soul Legends
 Cheryl Lynn at MySpace

1957 births
Living people
20th-century African-American women singers
American expatriates in Japan
American women pop singers
American soul singers
American disco singers
American boogie musicians
Singers from Los Angeles
Virgin Records artists
Columbia Records artists
American rhythm and blues singers
Contestants on American game shows
21st-century African-American people
21st-century African-American women